Siloam Springs is a city in Benton County, Arkansas, United States, and located on the western edge of the Northwest Arkansas metropolitan area.  As of the 2020 census, the population of the city was 17,287.  The community was founded in 1882 and was characterized by the purported healing powers of the spring water feeding Sager Creek and trading with nearby Native American tribes.  The city shares a border on the Arkansas-Oklahoma state line with the city of West Siloam Springs, Oklahoma, which is within the Cherokee Nation territory.  It is home of John Brown University.

History

Osage Indians were the known first inhabitants of the area. Siloam Springs' first white settlers were of German and Scots-Irish origin. Simon Sager is considered the founder of the town, then known as Hico.

In 2012, the city was named one of the 20 best small towns in America by Smithsonian magazine

Geography

The area is located in the Mid-South region of the country where the southern plains meet the Ozark Mountains. The city sits atop a plateau with many dogwood trees growing across the landscape. 

A perennial creek, named after the founder, Sager Creek, flows through the downtown area.

Metropolitan area
The Fayetteville–Springdale–Rogers Metropolitan Area consists of three Arkansas counties: Benton, Madison, and Washington, and McDonald County, Missouri. The area had a population of 347,045 at the 2000 census which had increased to 463,204 by the 2010 Census (an increase of 33.47 percent). Siloam Springs is at the extreme western edge of this area, connected to the principal cities by Highway 412.

Climate
The climate in this area is characterized by hot, humid summers and generally mild to cool winters.  According to the Köppen Climate Classification system, Siloam Springs has a humid subtropical climate, abbreviated "Cfa" on climate maps.

Temperatures above  are rare but not uncommon, occurring on average twice a year. Highs below  occur on average thirteen times a year, with 2.2 nights per year dropping below .

Precipitation is weakly seasonal, with a bimodal pattern: wet seasons in the spring and fall, and relatively drier summers and winters, but some rain in all months.  The spring wet season is more pronounced than fall, with the highest rainfall in May.  This differs slightly from the climate in central Arkansas, where the fall wet season is more comparable to spring.

Demographics

2020 census

As per the 2020 United States Census, there were 17,287 people, 5,382 households, and 3,980 families residing in the city.

2010 census
As of the census of 2010, there were 15,039 people in 5,138 households with 93.3% of the population in households.  The racial and ethnic composition of the population was 76% non-Hispanic white, 0.8% black, 4.6% Native American, 1.6% Asian, 0.2% non-Hispanic reporting some other race, 5.0% from two or more races and 20.8% Hispanic or Latino.

2000 census
At the 2000 census, there were 2,647 families residing in the city. The racial makeup of the city was 85.22% White, 0.49% Black or African American, 4.29% Native American, 0.83% Asian, 0.08% Pacific Islander, 5.67% from other races, and 3.42% from two or more races.  14.00% of the population were Hispanic or Latino of any race.

There were 3,894 households, out of which 34.8% had children under the age of 18 living with them, 53.8% were married couples living together, 10.6% had a female householder with no husband present, and 32.0% were non-families. 26.9% of all households were made up of individuals, and 11.9% had someone living alone who was 65 years of age or older.  The average household size was 2.57 and the average family size was 3.11.

come for a household in the city was $34,513, and the median income for a family was $41,153. Males had a median income of $27,339 versus $21,451 for females. The per capita income for the city was $16,047.  About 9.5% of families and 12.5% of the population were below the poverty line, including 17.6% of those under age 18 and 8.6% of those age 65 or over.

, there were 52 churches that called Siloam Springs home by address. There are reports that Siloam Springs has a record for most number churches per capita, and while the ratio is higher than average, it has never been verified through reliable documentation. (Despite the large number of churches, the town does contain a small atheist/non-religious community.) 

Major employers in Siloam Springs include Simmons Foods, Gates Corporation, La-Z-Boy, DaySpring (a subsidiary of Hallmark Cards), Cobb-Vantress, and John Brown University.

Arts and culture

Annual cultural events

Government
Siloam Springs has a city administrator form of government. The government body consists of the mayor, board of directors and district judge. All positions are chosen by election. The other officials and commissioners are appointed with Board approval.

Education 

In addition to John Brown University, public education is supported by the Siloam Springs School District consisting of:
 Siloam Springs High School (grades 9-12)
 Siloam Springs Middle School (grades 7-8)
 Siloam Springs Intermediate School (grades 5-6)
 Southside Elementary School (grades 3-4)
 Allen Elementary School (grades 1 & 2)
 Northside Elementary School (grades Pre-K & K)
 Siloam Springs Virtual Academy (grades K-12)

Infrastructure

Transportation
Siloam Springs traffic is primarily served by US 412 for east-west travel, connecting the city to Tulsa, Oklahoma, to the west via the Cherokee Turnpike and to Bentonville, Fayetteville, and Springdale, Arkansas, to the east. US 59 runs south from West Siloam Springs to Stilwell and Sallisaw, Oklahoma, while Arkansas 59 runs north to Gravette and south to Van Buren and Fort Smith, Arkansas. Within the city, major routes include Cheri Whitlock Drive, Lincoln Street, Main Street, Mount Olive Street, and University Street.

Smith Field, located east of town, serves small business jets as well as double- and single-engine aircraft. It serves exclusively general aviation operations.

Utilities

The city's primary water source is the Illinois River, although some water is purchased from Benton - Washington Regional Public Water Authority, whose source is Beaver Lake. The water is treated with chlorine, and the by-products of this chlorination process are kept compliant with the Arkansas Department of Health standards. Fluoride is added to supplement the naturally occurring amount present prior to treatment.

Wastewater is treated at the Siloam Springs Wastewater Treatment Plant (SSWWTP). Since effluent is discharged into a tributary of the Illinois, the plant's effluent is required to meet the treatment standards of both Arkansas and Oklahoma. The phosphorus load of the Illinois has been subject of controversy in the area, even reaching the United States Supreme Court in 1992. The Environmental Protection Agency (EPA) has classified the Illinois as Section 303(d) of the Clean Water Act, listing it as an "impaired and threatened water" due to the high phosphorus loads. As a result of the applicable strict phosphorus effluent regulations, SSWWTP upgraded its system in 2011. The upgrades also increased capacity 25% to 5.5 million gallons per day (MGD) (14,474 liters per hour). Although presently a traditional biological nutrient removal (BNR) plant capable of meeting the interim phosphorus limit, pilot tests have proven a chemical nutrient removal (CNR) and membrane biological reactor combination to be effective well below the possible future permit limit. However, due to the high cost, these phases have been delayed. Currently, a 3-year study is being conducted to determine the background phosphorus level in the Illinois. The future effluent limits will likely be written following the conclusion of the study. An EPA total maximum daily load (TMDL) study in the watershed is also ongoing.

Notable people
 Duncan Baird, Republican politician from District 96 in Benton County, graduated from Siloam Springs High School
 Jonathan Barnett, Republican politician from District 87 in Benton and Washington counties

 Preston Bynum, a lobbyist in Little Rock, served as the state representative from Siloam Springs from 1969 to 1980
 Mike Flynn, radio personality, hosts the NPR program The Folk Sampler
 Alice Ghostley, actress, spent a number of years in Siloam Springs as a youth
 Jim Winn, Major League Baseball pitcher, went to John Brown University in Siloam Springs
 Jonathan Earl Woods, Republican politician, served as former member of both houses of the Arkansas General Assembly

See also
 
 Arkansas Highway 99, a former highway designation in Siloam Springs

References

External links
 City of Siloam Springs official website

 
Cities in Benton County, Arkansas
Cities in Arkansas
Northwest Arkansas
Populated places established in 1882
1882 establishments in Arkansas